The 1978–79 European Cup was the 14th edition of the European Cup, IIHF's premier European club ice hockey tournament. The season started on September 12, 1978, and finished on August 29, 1979.

The tournament was won by CSKA Moscow, who won the final group.

First round

 SC Riessersee  :  bye

Second round

Third round

 Ässät,   
 Skellefteå AIK   :  bye

Fourth round

 Poldi Kladno,  
 CSKA Moscow   :  bye

Final Group
(Innsbruck, Tyrol, Austria)

Final group standings

References
 Season 1979

1978–79 in European ice hockey
IIHF European Cup